Al-Tayba (also spelled Tayyiba or Tayibah) is a village in eastern Syria, administratively part of the Homs Governorate. It is located in the Syrian Desert, near the Euphrates River to the east and al-Sukhnah and the village of al-Kawm to the west. Like many of the other desert towns in Syria, it is situated in a spring-fed oasis. According to the Central Bureau of Statistics (CBS), al-Taybah had a population of 2,413 in the 2004 census.

History
Al-Taybah is an Arabic name meaning "the Good."
In the early 13th-century Syrian geographer Yaqut al-Hamawi noted al-Taybah was a "village in the district of 'Urd, lying between Palmyra and Aleppo."

Al-Taybah was visited in 1616 by Italian explorer Pietro Della Valle, who noted that the presence of several "old relics" in the village. The mosque was well-maintained and appeared to have previously served as a church tower. Residences consisted of mud huts, many of which were reinforced by ancient stone columns.

The village was abandoned sometime in the 18th century with its inhabitants migrating to nearby al-Sukhnah. The modern-day settlement was founded in 1870 after one of the descendants of the 17th-century emigrants from al-Taybah and a resident of al-Sukhnah obtained permission by the governor of the Sanjak of Zor (Deir ez-Zor). He established the new village with ten or twelve other families. The Ottomans set up a gendarmerie post there afterward. In 1838 al-Taybah was classified as an abandoned village by English scholar Eli Smith.

At some point between 1914 and 1918, during World War I when Ottoman authority in Syria was being challenged, al-Taybah was raided and looted by Bedouin tribesmen from the area, resulting in a second exodus of the village's residents. It was reoccupied during French Mandate rule which restored a level of security in al-Taybah.

During the Syrian Civil war, the Islamic State of Iraq and the Levant (ISIL) captured the village. However, on 20 August 2017, the Army stormed the Taybah area from their positions at the Al-Kawm axis, pushing their way through ISIL's front-lines. Unable to maintain their positions, ISIL was forced to retreat from Taybah, leaving the entire area for the Army to take control of after a short battle.

References

Bibliography

.
.
 

Populated places in Tadmur District